Mynatharuvi Kolakase is a 1967 Indian Malayalam-language film, directed and produced by Kunchacko. The film stars Sathyan, Sheela, Adoor Bhasi and Hari. The film had musical score by V. Dakshinamoorthy.

The film was based on the Madatharuvi murder case in Kerala, involving the murder of a widow named Mariyakutty in 1966. A priest, Fr. Benedict Onamkulam, was wrongly convicted of the crime. Another film, Madatharuvi, based on the same theme was released in 1967. It was directed and produced by P. A. Thomas under the banner of Thomas Pictures. The film had actors like Sukumari, Adoor Bhasi, Thikkurissy Sukumaran Nair and Musthafa.

Cast

Sathyan
Sheela
Adoor Bhasi
Hari
Manavalan Joseph
Jijo
Adoor Pankajam
Alummoodan
Kaduvakulam Antony
Kottarakkara Sreedharan Nair
N. Govindankutty
Nellikode Bhaskaran
Pankajavalli
S. P. Pillai
Sunny

Soundtrack
The music was composed by V. Dakshinamoorthy and the lyrics were written by Vayalar Ramavarma.

References

External links
 

1967 films
1960s Malayalam-language films